Kazarino is a rural locality (a khutor) in Ozerkinskoye Rural Settlement, Kikvidzensky District, Volgograd Oblast, Russia. The population was 164 as of 2010.

Geography 
Kazarino is located in steppe, on Khopyorsko-Buzulukskaya plain, on the south bank of the Kazarina Lake, 10 km northeast of Preobrazhenskaya (the district's administrative centre) by road. Semyonovka is the nearest rural locality.

References 

Rural localities in Kikvidzensky District